The orthography of the Belarusian language was reformed in 1933 during the Soviet era.

Differences between the old and the new orthography
 Loanword orthography is regulated:
 Central-European L is transmitted as hard  and not soft , as in Russian
Also unified is the spelling of names in dative and prepositional case.

See also 
 Narkamauka
 Differences between Taraškievica and the official orthography

References 
 Two Standard Languages within Belarusian: a Case of Bi-cultural Conflict by Ihar Klimaŭ (Belarusian State University of Culture and Arts) - École normale supérieure, 25 March 2006

Belarusian language
Orthography reform
1933 in the Soviet Union
1933 in Belarus
Reform in the Soviet Union
Russification
Belarusian orthography